Bhikhan Lal Atreya (1897–1967) was an Indian writer and scholar, known for his writings on the Hindu scripture, Yogavasishtha. He was a professor of philosophy at Banaras Hindu University and did academic research on parapsychology and mysticism. The Yogavāsistha and Its Philosophy,
The essence of Yogavāsiṣṭha
and An Introduction to Parapsychology are some of his notable books. The Government of India awarded him the third highest civilian honour of the Padma Bhushan, in 1957, for his contributions to literature and education.

Selected bibliography

See also 
 Yogavasishtha

References

External links 
 

Recipients of the Padma Bhushan in literature & education
1897 births
1967 deaths
20th-century Indian philosophers
Academic staff of Banaras Hindu University
Indian religious writers